This timeline lists the dates of the first women's suffrage in Muslim majority countries. Dates for the right to vote, suffrage, as distinct from the right to stand for election and hold office, are listed.

Some countries with majority Muslim populations established universal suffrage upon national independence, including Pakistan, Bangladesh, Indonesia, and Malaysia. In most North Africa countries, women participated in the first national elections or soon following. Some dates relate to regional elections and, where possible, the second date of general election has been included. Even countries listed may not have universal suffrage for women, and some may have regressed in women's rights since the initial granting of suffrage.

Timeline

1917 
  Crimean People's Republic

1918 
 Azerbaijan Democratic Republic
 (Soviet Republic)

1920

1921 
 (Soviet Republic)

1924 
 (Soviet Republic) 
 (Soviet Republic)

1927 
 (Soviet Republic)

1930 
 (municipal elections)

1932

1934 
 (national elections)

1938 
 (Soviet Republic)

1945

1946 

 French Somaliland

1947
 (Upon its national independence)

1948 
 (first ever free elections were held in 2005)

1949

1952 
 (An educational requirement).

1956

1957 
 (universal).
 (Now Peninsular Malaysia)

1958

1959

1960

1961

1962 

 (revoked)

1963 
 (after a referendum)

1964

1965 
 (first time)

1967

1970

1972 
 (Bangladesh achieved independence on December 16, 1971 and women suffrage was never barred)

1973 
  (Bahrain did not hold elections until 2002)

1974

1976
 (women allowed to vote in local elections for the first time; at the previous election, in 1972, only male property owners could vote)

1978
 (North)

1985
  (first time)

1996 
 (revoked by  Taliban)
 (first elections held in the territory since 1923)

1999 

 (revoked)

2002 
 (re-granted after the fall of  Taliban)

2003

2005
  (re-granted)

2006

2011 
 (introduced along with right to run for municipal elections in 2015)

See also
 Rawya Ateya (first female parliamentarian in Egypt and the Arab world)
 List of the first female members of parliament by country
 List of equal or majority Muslim countries
 List of suffragists and suffragettes
 List of women's rights activists
 Sex segregation in Islam
 Timeline of women's suffrage
 Women in Islam

References

Islamic feminism
Women's suffrage by country
Society-related timelines
suffrage muslim